Silent Spring Institute is a nonprofit organization dedicated to studying and reporting primarily on breast cancer prevention, although its research covers other health-related topics as well.

Founding and purpose

The nonprofit organization was founded in 1994 "as an outgrowth of the Massachusetts Breast Cancer Coalition." It engages in research on the links between risk of breast cancer and exposure to chemicals found in everyday products. Its scientific team does field testing on Cape Cod and collaborates with private and academic laboratories. In 2014 the Cape Cod Times recalled that:

From the start, Silent Spring Institute researchers were interested in whether environmental toxins were having a particular influence on the Cape's drinking water, which is served by a sole source aquifer and leaches through sandy soil that in theory allows wastewater – and contaminants – to drain into the water supply more quickly than through other types of soil.
Silent Spring researchers have tested water in public and private wells for the presence of chemicals known as emerging contaminants and have visited scores of Cape homes to measure for the presence of hormone-disrupting chemicals.

Based in Newton, Massachusetts, the institute was named in honor of environmentalist Rachel Carson, who died of breast cancer.

Research

Background

The only independent research institute dedicated to studying breast cancer prevention, Silent Spring Institute has established a reputation for exemplary research. In keeping with Silent Spring's commitment to collaboration between scientists and activists, researchers report individual exposure results to all individuals and communities participating in its studies. It has become a pioneer in developing ethical methods for communicating results when the health implications are uncertain. In 2000, Silent Spring's research was honored with a U.S. Environmental Protection Agency Environmental Merit Award.

The papers of Silent Spring Institute from 1988 to 2006 are archived at the Schlesinger Library at Harvard, which has prepared a detailed finding aid.

Projects

 The institute partnered with the Lawrence Berkeley National Laboratory in a research project on "Chemicals and Breast Cancer: Building on National Initiatives for Chemical Safety Screening," which focused on the development of rapid in vitro screens for breast carcinogens in mammary cells. A report was published in 2014.
 Researchers from the institute and from the University of Antwerp, Belgium, reported in 2014 that there had been "limited information" about Americans' exposure to phosphate flame retardants and how such exposure might affect their health, so in 2011 a urine analysis and study was made of sixteen California residents, and all were found to have traces of three harmful chemicals – bis-(1,3-dichloro-2-propyl) phosphate (BDCIPP), tris-(1,3-dichloro-isopropyl) phosphate (TDCIPP) and bis-(2-chloroethyl) phosphate (BCEP).

The lead researcher, the institute's Robin Dodson, said: "We found that several toxic flame retardants are in people's bodies. When you sit on your couch, you want to relax, not get exposed to chemicals that may cause cancer. Medical News Today said that "Flame retardant chemicals are found in a variety of products that we come into contact with every day, such as carpets, sofas, curtains and even baby products. The chemicals were introduced to these products in the 1970s to reduce the likelihood of ignitability." It noted that another chemical, tris-(2-chloroethyl) phosphate (TCEP), "known to cause cancer and reproductive problems in humans," was found in about 75% if the subjects and that it had "never before been discovered in Americans." Counsel and Health noted that "The team also found that residents with the highest levels of TCEP and TDCIPP in their urine lived in homes that had respective chemical in dust, which suggests that the home and the furniture in it are exposing people to toxic flame retardants."

Medical News Today concluded:

The researchers note that there are strategies consumers can adopt to reduce their exposure to toxic flame retardants. Because the chemicals are likely to gather in dust, they recommend that individuals use a vacuum with a high-efficiency particulate air (HEPA) filter to vacuum their homes. This filter traps particles, rather than recirculate them back into the air. They also recommend that people throw away any foam that is deteriorating in their households, as it is possible such products may emit higher levels of toxic chemicals.

The study was published in the journal Environmental Science & Technology.
 
 Early in 2014 the institute published a paper in Environmental Health Perspectives that listed "17 types of chemicals to avoid, including those in gasoline, diesel exhaust, flame retardants and paint thinner." Forbes magazine called the paper a "massive synthesis of data from the National Toxicology Program and consensus reports from international cancer authorities" which "identified 102 chemicals as critical for breast cancer research and prevention." The institute said the study was "a road map for breast cancer prevention by identifying high-priority chemicals and evaluating tools to measure exposure."

In 2014, Silent Spring published a list of 100 breast carcinogens with widespread exposure and identified methods to measure them in people, providing a road map for breast cancer research and policies to reduce exposure.

The authors of the study were Ruthann A. Rudel, Janet M. Ackerman and Julia Green Brody of the Silent Spring Institute and Kathleen R. Attfield of the Harvard School of Public Health. United Press International summed up its results by stating: "Gasoline and chemicals formed by combustion from vehicles, lawn equipment, smoking and charred food are among the largest sources of mammary carcinogens in the environment." In detail, these carcinogens included:

Solvents, such as methylene chloride and other halogenated organic solvents used in spot removers, specialty cleaners and industrial degreasers. Pharmaceutical hormones such as hormone replacement therapy; certain flame retardants used in furniture; a chemical used in stain-resistant textiles and non-stick coatings; and styrene found in tobacco smoke and also used to make Styrofoam. Drinking water. It can contain mammary carcinogens, such disinfection by-products or solvents.

 In 2013 the Science of the Total Environment journal published a study led by institute scientist Laurel Schaider that "looked at emerging contaminants in septic systems" on Cape Cod and their impact on water wells. It found that "Caffeine and acetaminophen were very well removed" by sewage treatment but "Not so well removed were an antibiotic containing sulfa, and PFOS, a chlorinated flame retardant commonly used in a number of home stain-resistant and nonstick coatings, as well as firefighting foams." It was "estimated that 80–85 percent of nitrogen comes from human waste not being properly processed via the Cape’s septic systems."
 A study by the institute, reported in 2012, found that a test of 50 household products such as cleaners, cosmetics and personal-care products found a "troubling amount" of "potentially harmful" products. Julia Brody of the institute advised consumers to avoid "antimicrobial products like some hand sanitizers and soaps" and "many products that contain fragrances." According to a television news report, "Silent Spring says look for 'paraben-free' products when shopping for deodorant, shampoo or cosmetics, and avoid vinyl products especially pillow and mattress protectors. The problem, the study finds, is that manufacturers are not required to list all ingredients."

 Industry groups responded quickly and negatively: The International Fragrance Association of North America said the study was "an example of biased, advocacy based research," and the Personal Care Products Council said that "equating the mere presence of chemicals in products with potential harm is wrong and needlessly scares consumers."

In 2007, Silent Spring published a database of 216 chemicals that cause mammary gland tumors in animal studies. Dubbed "the breast cancer list" by Science  magazine, the study made headlines by highlighting new hypotheses about environmental risks and showing that common exposures, including diesel and benzene in gasoline, were biologically plausible links to breast cancer.
 In its first decade, the research team focused on identifying biologically suspect chemicals and measuring personal exposure. Silent Spring's 2003 Household Exposure Study (HES) was the first and most comprehensive assessment of endocrine disruptors in homes; it documented consumer products as the primary source of the chemicals.
 Silent Spring began by investigating the links between hormone disruptors and human health among women on Cape Cod. The study, published in 2004, showed that the longer that women lived on Cape Cod, the higher was their breast cancer risk.

Other activities

The organization celebrated its twentieth anniversary on October 20, 2014, with a fund-raising dinner at the Royal Sonesta Hotel in Cambridge, Massachusetts. Speakers included New York Times journalist Nicholas Kristof, author Florence Williams and institute director Julia Brody. Ellen Parker of Newton, the chair of the institute's board, received its Rachel Carson Advocacy Award. Reporter Kelley Tuthill of radio station WCVB was the master of ceremonies.

Leadership

In late 2014 Julia Brody was executive director, and Cynthia Barakatt was chair of the board. Ellen Calmas was a board member.

Funding

During the seven years after its founding in 1995, the institute received $8.5 million in state grants, but as it prepared to celebrate its 20th anniversary in 2014, state support had vanished and no help at all was granted in the state budget that year. Nor had it been granted in the 2010, 2011 or 2012 fiscal years. Speaking about the falloff in appropriations, Representative Randy Hunt of Sandwich said, according to the Cape Cod Times, that "some people associated with Silent Spring have raised hackles." Hunt was quoted as saying that Silent Spring "activists" had been known to "denigrate anyone who they don't feel is pushing for their cause as hard as they want."  The Times quoted co-founder Cheryl Osimo as responding, "I understand perhaps my passion can be misunderstood as abrasive." She said the loss of funds was caused by a "difficult economy," resulting in an increased need for private donations.

Sylvia Connor of East Sandwich, a breast cancer survivor and Silent Spring volunteer, said . . . that she and other survivors feel strongly about continuing the work of the research institute.
She said ... it was a "slap in the face" to see [State Representative] Brian Mannal join forces with actor Mark Ruffalo on his Water Defense organization at a time when Silent Spring has been doing without state funds.

References

Further reading

  Jeanne Rizzo and Julia Brody, "50 Years After Rachel Carson," The Huffington Post, April 29, 2014
  "Contaminants Pervasive In Cape Cod's Drinking Water Supply, Silent Spring Institute Finds," Water Online, September 18, 2013

External links 

Records of Silent Spring Institute, 1970-2011: A Finding Aid. Schlesinger Library, Radcliffe Institute, Harvard University.

1994 establishments in Massachusetts
Breast cancer organizations
Newton, Massachusetts
Medical and health organizations based in Massachusetts
Organizations established in 1994